Valentina Butnaru (born 3 September 1958 in Vorniceni) is a journalist and activist from the Republic of Moldova. She is the head of the Association "Limba noastră cea română" in Chișinău.

Biography
Butnaru was born to Vasile and Claudia Piui on 3 September 1958, in Vorniceni, Strășeni. She graduated from Moldova State University in 1980. Valentina Butnaru is the president of the Association "Limba noastră cea română", Chișinău. The association was founded on 17 March 1990 and has over 50 branches.

Awards
 National Order "For Merit", 2000.
 Medal Mihai Eminescu, 1996.
 Diplome de membru de onoare al Asociațiunii ASTRA (Despărțămintele Săcele-Brașov, Năsăud, Orăștie, Iași, 1998-2005).

Bibliography
Pohilă Vlad, Val Butnaru -  Calendar Național, National Library of Moldova, 2005
Cheianu Constantin, Despre teatrul lui Val Butnaru - Butnaru, Val. "Apusul de soare se amână", Chișinău, Cartier, 2003
Proca Pavel, Mâine, sau poate poimâine se amână; Portrete cu jobenu-n sus, Chișinău, 2004

References

External links
 Valentina Butnaru. „Generalul” limbii române
 Valentina Butnaru. „Generalul” limbii române
 EU şi EU: Valentina Butnaru, preşedintele Societăţii "Limba noastră cea română", Chişinău
 (AUDIO)Interviuri pentru seri de duminica Protagonistă – Valentina Butnaru, 30.08.09
 Valentina Butnaru

1958 births
Living people
Moldovan writers
Moldovan women journalists
Moldova State University alumni
People from Strășeni District
Jurnal Trust Media
Romanian people of Moldovan descent
Recipients of the National Order of Merit (Romania)